The Big Killing may refer to:

The Big Killing (1928 film), American silent comedy
The Big Killing (1965 film), Australian live television drama
 The Big Killing, a 1996 novel by British author Robert Wilson